Acta Ornithologica is an ornithological scientific periodical published in Poland (two issues per year) by the Polish Academy of Sciences. It is in English with summaries in Polish. It was established in 1933 as Acta Ornithologica Musei Zoologici Polonici and obtained its current name in 1953.

See also
 List of ornithology journals

References

External links
 

Journals and magazines relating to birding and ornithology
Science and technology in Poland
Publications established in 1933
English-language journals
Polish Academy of Sciences academic journals
Biannual journals